Gal Oya Junction (Sinhala: ගල් ඔය හන්දිය) is a railway station in the North Central Province of Sri Lanka. 

The station is a junction station, where the Trincomalee line branches off from the Batticaloa line. It is owned and operated by Sri Lanka Railways. 

Usually over 24 trains run weekly.

Continuity

References 

Railway stations in North Central Province, Sri Lanka
Railway stations on the Batticaloa Line
Railway stations on the Trincomalee Line